Mount Bjerke is a large mountain, forming the southern end of the Conrad Mountains in the Orvin Mountains, Queen Maud Land. Discovered and photographed by the German Antarctic Expedition, 1938–39. Mapped by Norway from air photos and surveys by Norwegian Antarctic Expedition, 1956–60, and named for Henry Bjerke, mechanic with Norwegian Antarctic Expedition, 1957–59.

See also
Henry Moraine

References

Mountains of Queen Maud Land
Princess Astrid Coast